The episode list for the American drama television series Early Edition. The show premiered in the United States on CBS on September 28, 1996. A total of 90 episodes were produced over the course of the show's four seasons, with the last original episode airing in the United States on May 27, 2000.

Series overview

Episodes

Season 1 (1996–97)
The first season contains a total of 23 episodes which were originally broadcast in the United States from September 28, 1996 to May 17, 1997.

Season 2 (1997–98)
The second season contains a total of 22 episodes which were originally broadcast in the United States from September 27, 1997 to May 23, 1998.

Season 3 (1998–1999)
The third season contains a total of 23 episodes which were originally broadcast in the United States from September 26, 1998 to May 15, 1999.

Season 4 (1999–2000)
The fourth and final season contains a total of 22 episodes which were originally broadcast in the United States from September 25, 1999 to May 27, 2000.

References

Lists of American comedy-drama television series episodes

it:Episodi di Ultime dal cielo (prima stagione)